There are many people named Antonio Molina. See Molina for a partial list.

José Antonio Molina Rositto (born February 28, 1926 in Tegucigalpa, died 23 September 2012), usually known as Antonio Molina, was a Honduran botanist and Professor emeritus at the Zamorano Pan-American School of Agriculture. 

Molina has discovered over 100 species of native, Honduran flora. One in particular, an orchid named Rhyncholaelia digbyana, was declared the national flower of Honduras (Flor Nacional de Honduras) on 1969 November 26.

Peter Karl Endress named Molinadendron, a particular genus of small evergreen trees, after Molina.

He is married to Albertina de Molina, also a professor at Zamorano.

Awards & distinctions
 Professor emeritus at Zamorano
 Junior Chamber International and Municipality of San Pedro Sula "Fall Recital" (Recital de Otoño) honoree (2004)
 Zamorano Chapter of Gamma Sigma Delta honoree (2006)

Publications
This list is incomplete.

References

1926 births
2020 deaths
Honduran botanists